The USATF National Club Cross Country Championships are an annual cross country competition for running clubs in the United States organized by USA Track & Field. The championships typically feature a 10K men's race and a 6K women's race, with the course changing every year. The first recorded race was held in Orlando, Florida in 1998.

The initial history of the competition was as part of the USA Cross Country Championships, founded in 1890. In 1975, the club element was partially divided from the main, individual focused national championship. The club event was held in fall while the individual event was held in winter. This arrangement became formal and permanent in 1998, with all national selections being moved to the winter competition and the USATF National Club Championships taking its current title.

Since 2018, this served as a selection meet for Great Stirling Cross Country meet in Scotland. The next event is scheduled for December 14, 2019 in Tallahassee, Florida.

History
Source of the results below is USATF's website

See also
USA Cross Country Championships

References

Running clubs in the United States
Cross country running in the United States
Cross country running competitions
Cross
Recurring sporting events established in 1998
December sporting events
1998 establishments in the United States